Michael Mills (born January 14, 1942) is a British-born Canadian producer and director of short films. He has received two Oscar nominations. He also made the Canadian Anthem Animation for Television stations, still being used by Ici Radio-Canada Télé

Oscar nominations
Both of the following films were in the category of Academy Award for Best Animated Short Film:

44th Academy Awards-Nominated for Evolution. Lost to The Crunch Bird.
53rd Academy Awards-Nominated for History of the World in Three Minutes Flat. Lost to The Fly.

References

External links

Living people
1942 births
Film producers from London
Canadian film producers
Canadian film directors
Directors of Genie and Canadian Screen Award winners for Best Animated Short
National Film Board of Canada people